Jacksonville Air Route Traffic Control Center (ZJX), (radio communications, Jacksonville Center) is one of 22 Area Control Centers in the United States. It is located at 37075 Aviation Ln, Hilliard, Florida.

The primary responsibility of Jacksonville Center is sequencing and separation of over-flights, arrivals, and departures in order to provide safe, orderly, and expeditious flow of aircraft filed under instrument flight rules (IFR).

Jacksonville Center is the fourth-busiest ARTCC in the United States. Between January 1 and December 31, 2017, Jacksonville Center handled 2,515,959 aircraft. 

ZJX also covers portions of the Atlantic Ocean and the Gulf of Mexico. 

Jacksonville Center lies adjacent to 5 different Air Route Traffic Control Centers, including Houston Air Route Traffic Control Center, New York Air Route Traffic Control Center, Washington Air Route Traffic Control Center, Atlanta Air Route Traffic Control Center, and Miami Air Route Traffic Control Center. ZJX overlies or abuts several approach control facilities (Jacksonville, Orlando, Daytona Beach, Tampa, Valdosta, Tallahassee, Tyndall, Eglin, Pensacola, Mobile,  Cairns, Atlanta, Savannah, Augusta, Beaufort, Charleston, Columbia, Myrtle Beach, Shaw, Florence, Wilmington, Fayetteville, Charlotte).

References

External links
Jacksonville Air Route Traffic Control Center (ARTCC) (FAA)
Jacksonville Center Weather Service Unit (CWSU) (NWS/FAA)

Air traffic control centers
Air traffic control in the United States
Aviation in Florida